Subjectivity is a peer-reviewed academic journal published quarterly in psychology and sociology. It was founded in 2008 as a successor to Critical Psychology and is published by Palgrave Macmillan.

Abstracting and indexing
The journal is abstracted and indexed in the following bibliographic databases:

References 

Palgrave Macmillan academic journals
Quarterly journals
Publications established in 2008
Psychology journals
Sociology journals
English-language journals